Pinstripers may refer to:

 A person who applies pinstriping
 A person accoutred with pin stripes